Washington County is a regional economic, educational, and cultural hub in the Northwest Arkansas region. Created as Arkansas's 17th county on November 30, 1848, Washington County has 13 incorporated municipalities, including Fayetteville, the county seat, and Springdale. The county is also the site of small towns, bedroom communities, and unincorporated places. The county is named for George Washington, the first President of the United States.

Located within the Ozark Mountains, the county is roughly divided into two halves: the rolling Springfield Plateau in the more populous north of the county and the steeper, forested Boston Mountains in the much less populated south. It contains three segments of the Ozark National Forest, two state parks, two Wildlife Management Areas, the Garrett Hollow Natural Area, and dozens of city parks. Other historical features such as Civil War battlefields, log cabins, one-room school houses, community centers, and museums describe the history and culture of Washington County.
 
Washington County occupies 951.72 square miles (243,220 ha) and contained a population of 245,871 people in 89,249 households as of the 2020 Census, ranking it 4th in size and 3rd in population among the state's 75 counties. The economy is largely based on the business/management, education, sales, office/administration, and poultry production industries. Poverty rates, median household income, and unemployment rates best state averages, but lag national trends. Politically, Washington County has transitioned from reliably Democratic to steadily Republican in national and state elections since the mid-20th century, with local offices following suit toward the end of the 20th century.

Washington County has long had a reputation for education in the state. The University of Arkansas, the largest four-year college in the state, was established in Fayetteville in 1871. A Washington County campus of the Northwest Arkansas Community College was opened in 2019. Today, Washington County contains eight public school districts, including two of the largest districts in the state (Springdale Public Schools and Fayetteville Public Schools) and two private schools.

It is included in the Fayetteville–Springdale–Rogers Metropolitan Statistical Area.

History

Washington County began as part of the Cherokee Territory, following an 1817 treaty. The area was next known as Lovely County, and one year later Washington County was created after another Cherokee treaty. The court house was centrally located in the city of Washington, modern-day Fayetteville (renamed to avoid confusion with Washington, Arkansas in South Arkansas). The Lee Creek Valley in southern Washington County contained many of the county's early settlements, including Cane Hill and Evansville.

Arkansas College and Cane Hill College were both founded in Washington County within a day of each other in 1834, with the University of Arkansas being founded in Fayetteville in 1871. The county witnessed major battles during the American Civil War, including the Battle of Fayetteville, the Battle of Prairie Grove, and the Battle of Cane Hill. The county then was sparsely settled and the residents were divided in their allegiance, since it had few enslaved people, plantations almost nonexistent, and political news came by White River travelers, not from the pro-Confederate southern part of the state. A Butterfield Overland Mail route was established through the county in 1858, causing more families to settle there.

In 1856, what appears to be an act of vengeance, prompted by a Black woman killing, in self-defense, a white man who sexually assaulted her, led to the lynching of two Black men and the hanging of another.

The economy of Washington County was based on apples in the late 19th century. A mixture of wet weather, altitude, and loamy soils provided a good environment for apple orchards.  First planted in areas around Lincoln, Evansville, and Cane Hill in the 1830s, apple orchards began all across the county. The United States Census reported a crop of 614,924 bushels of apples produced by the county in 1900, the highest in the state. Several varieties of apple were discovered in the area including Shannon Pippin, Wilson June, and most notably the Arkansas Black. The Ben Davis became the apple of choice in the area for sale and shipment across the region. Corn became the dominant crop, outselling apples by almost $500,000 in 1900.

Arkansas Industrial University was founded in the growing community of Fayetteville in 1871 after William McIlroy a donated farmland for the site. The university changed its name in 1899 to the University of Arkansas. Railroads came to Washington County after the St. Louis – San Francisco Railway (Frisco) decided to build a line to Texas through Fort Smith. Two possible routes were proposed, one passing through Prairie Grove, the other through Fayetteville. Many Fayetteville residents and farmers sold or donated land for the right of way to influence the choice. They were successful and in 1881 the first passenger train arrived at Fayetteville. The county continued to grow with more churches and schools after the railroad's completion. Rural parts of the county began losing population in the 1920s during the Great Depression, when high taxes compelled residents to move to Fayetteville or west to Oklahoma. The rural areas later became the Ozark National Forest and Devil's Den State Park.

Geography

The county is located in the Ozark Mountains, a small mountain region between the Appalachians and the Rocky Mountains with distinct settlement patterns, history, and culture from surrounding agrarian regions (the Interior Plains of the Midwest United States and Mississippi Delta to the southeast), and the flat ranchlands of the Great Plains to the west. In the Ozarks, population density is low; recreation, logging, and poultry and livestock farming are the primary land uses. Pastureland or hayland occur on nearly level ridgetops, benches, and valley floors. Water quality in streams is generally exceptional. Most of the county is within the mountainous, forested Boston Mountains, with the north and west portions made up of the nearly level to rolling Springfield Plateau. Karst features such as springs, losing streams, sinkholes and caves are common.

It is the fourth-largest county by area in Arkansas.

Washington County is surrounded by Benton County to the north, rural Madison County to the east, the rural Crawford County to the south, and Adair County, Oklahoma to the west.

Geology
Washington County sits on a basement of Precambrian granite and rhyolite, as most of the continental interior of the United States does. Much of the county's geologic history must be inferred from nearby Oklahoma and Missouri research, due to the steepness of the more recently formed mountains that did not form in the neighboring states. This igneous material was eroded until the Paleozoic, when oceans covered the now-low-lying area. These oceans came and retreated for 300 million years, depositing various different sediments during that time. This created fossiliferous limestone and ripple marked-sandstone, both present throughout the north part of the county as evidence of ancient oceans.

Sediments were deposited from the Devonian, Mississippian, and Pennsylvanian periods. During this deposition period, the county had a climate similar to that of the present-day Bahamas, as the equator was north of Washington County. The Devonian brought mostly shales, the Mississippian brought the limestones and chert visible in the bluffs. This chert is present throughout most of the county. The county is also home to the Boone Formation (red soils), white limestones, the Wedington Sandstone, the Bastesville Sandstone, the Pitkin formation (ocean-fossil limestone), and the Fayetteville Shale.

Settlers were attracted to the area by its numerous streams, used to power gristmills, sandstones and clays for use in construction, lime-sweetened soil, and chert for road construction.

Today, Washington County consists of two main formations, the Boston Mountains and the Springfield Plateau. During the late Pennsylvanian, sediments were deposited on top of the Springfield Plateau. The area was uplifted during the Ouachita orogeny and subsequent erosion formed the rugged Boston Mountains. Erosion of these sediments causes the Boston Mountains to be carved steeply in the south, while in the north of the county, the Boston Mountain sediments are almost entirely eroded, exposing the older rocks of the Springfield Plateau.

Hydrology

Washington County fits within three regional watersheds: the eastern half drains to the White River (or Beaver Lake) and the west drains to the Illinois River, with a small segment in the south draining to the Arkansas River via the Lee Creek watershed. Within the county, Clear Creek, Moore's Creek, Richland Creek, and Spring Creek are important watercourses. The county also contains eleven natural springs listed by the United States Geological Survey Board on Geographic Names, including Elkhorn Springs, Elm Springs, and Greathouse Spring in Johnson.

As a mountainous county, it contains only one natural lake and several reservoirs. Most of these reservoirs, such as Lake Prairie Grove and Lincoln Lake were created for flood control or water supplies in the 20th century. Beaver Lake, located mostly in Benton County with reaches extending into Washington and Madison counties, is the sixth-largest lake in Arkansas, and a source of recreation, tourism, and drinking water for the Northwest Arkansas region. Washington County also contains Lake Wedington, located in the Ozark National Forest west of Fayetteville on Highway 16.

Protected areas

Washington County contains three discontinuous segments of the Ozark National Forest, two state parks, two Wildlife Management Areas (WMAs) under Arkansas Game and Fish Commission jurisdiction, the Garrett Hollow Natural Area, and dozens of city parks.

The Wedington WMA is a hardwood forest owned by the United States Forest Service known for archery, deer hunting, fishing, and boating on Lake Wedington. The southeast corner of Washington County contains part of the White Rock WMA, an expansive section of the Ozark National Forest containing some of the steepest segments of the Boston Mountains covered in a mix of shortleaf pine and hardwood forest. White Rock WMA has six camping areas, four lakes, and numerous trails. Public hunting for squirrels, deer, wild turkeys, and black bear is available during certain seasons

Devil's Den State Park in southern Washington County is known for its picturesque views and mountain vistas. Prairie Grove Battlefield State Park was the site of the Battle of Prairie Grove, fought December 7, 1862, in the American Civil War. The park offers tours of the battlefield and period structures and contains the Hindman Museum, which preserves artifacts and interprets the history of the battle. Arkansas's largest Civil War battle reenactment takes place on t he battlefield in December of even numbered years.

Demographics

2020 Census

As of the 2020 United States census, there were 245,871 people, 89,249 households, and 56,596 families residing in the county.

2010 Census

As of the 2010 United States Census, there were 203,065 people, 76,389 households, and 48,059 families residing in the county. There were 87,808 housing units at an average density of 92 per square mile (36/km2). The racial makeup of the county was 79.9% White, 3.0% Black or African American, 1.2% Native American, 2.2% Asian, 2.0% Pacific Islander, 8.9% from other races, and 2.8% from two or more races. 15.5% of the population were Hispanic or Latino of any race.

There were 76,389 households, out of which 30.9% had children under the age of 18 living with them, 47.4% were married couples living together, 10.6% had a female householder with no husband present, and 37.1% were non-families. 27.5% of all households were made up of individuals, and 6.9% had someone living alone who was 65 years of age or older. The average household size was 2.56 and the average family size was 3.18.

In the county, the population was spread out, with 25.4% under the age of 18, 14.9% from 18 to 24, 28.5% from 25 to 44, 21.5% from 45 to 64, and 9.7% who were 65 years of age or older. The median age was 30.7 years. For every 100 females, there were 99.9 males. For every 100 females age 18 and over, there were 98.1 males.

The median income for a household in the county was $42,303, and the median income for a family was $52,300. Males had a median income of $37,430 versus $28,990 for females. The per capita income for the county was $22,421. About 12.1% of families and 17.9% of the population were below the poverty line, including 23.5% of those under age 18 and 9.5% of those age 65 or over.

2000 Census

As of the 2000 United States Census, there were 157,715 people, 60,151 households, and 39,459 families residing in the county. There were 64,330 housing units at an average density of 68 per square mile (26/km2). The racial makeup of the county was 88.00% White, 2.24% Black or African American, 1.25% Native American, 1.54% Asian, 0.53% Pacific Islander, 4.26% from other races, and 2.17% from two or more races.  8.20% of the population were Hispanic or Latino of any race.

There were 60,151 households, out of which 32.50% had children under the age of 18 living with them, 52.30% were married couples living together, 9.40% had a female householder with no husband present, and 34.40% were non-families. 25.80% of all households were made up of individuals, and 7.10% had someone living alone who was 65 years of age or older.  The average household size was 2.52 and the average family size was 3.07.

In the county, the population was spread out, with 25.00% under the age of 18, 15.30% from 18 to 24, 30.20% from 25 to 44, 19.50% from 45 to 64, and 9.90% who were 65 years of age or older.  The median age was 31 years. For every 100 females, there were 100.40 males.  For every 100 females age 18 and over, there were 98.70 males.

The median income for a household in the county was $34,691, and the median income for a family was $42,795. Males had a median income of $29,428 versus $21,769 for females. The per capita income for the county was $17,347.  About 9.40% of families and 14.60% of the population were below the poverty line, including 16.50% of those under age 18 and 10.20% of those age 65 or over.

Human resources

Education

Washington County has historically been known as a center for education in Arkansas. Cane Hill College in Canehill was the first college in Arkansas, prior to the University of Arkansas's founding in 1871.

A 2012 study found 84.2% of Washington County residents over age 25 held a high school degree or higher and 31.9% holding a bachelor's degree or higher. The Washington County high school rates are similar to state and national averages of 84.8% and 86.7%, respectively. The bachelor's degree rate is the second-highest of any county in Arkansas (statewide average of 21.1%, only behind Pulaski County's 33.7%), but only slightly above the national averages of 29.8%.

Primary and secondary education
School districts include:

 Elkins School District
 Farmington School District
 Fayetteville School District
 Greenland Public Schools
 Lincoln School District
 Prairie Grove School District
 Siloam Springs Schools
 Springdale School District
 West Fork School District

Private schools:
Haas Hall Academy
Ozark Montessori Academy Springdale

Higher education

The University of Arkansas at Fayetteville was founded in 1871 on the site of a hilltop farm that overlooked the Ozark Mountains, giving it the nickname "The Hill". It is the largest institution of higher learning in the state, with a fall 2019 undergraduate enrollment of 23,025 making UA three times larger than the next-largest institutions. Of the six undergraduate academic units, the largest is J. William Fulbright College of Arts and Sciences, followed by the Sam M. Walton College of Business and the College of Education and Health Professions. Enrollment increased 50% following the Campaign for the 21st Century, with much of the growth coming from out-of-state students. As a result, out-of-state students have a significant influence on the Washington County demographics and economy.

The Northwest Arkansas Community College opened a campus in Springdale in 2019.

Library system
Washington County is home to the Fayetteville Public Library and the Washington County Library System (WCLS). The WCLS consists of eight branch libraries, including the Springdale Public Library and seven branches in smaller cities across the county. The libraries offers books, e-books, media, reference, youth, business and genealogy services.

Public health

Arkansas Children's Northwest Hospital
Encompass Health Rehabilitation Hospital
Mercy Hospital Northwest Arkansas
Northwest Medical Center
Behavior Health Unit
Emergency Department
Willow Creek Women's Hospital
Physicians' Specialty Hospital 
Parkhill The Clinic for Women
Regency Hospital
Springwoods Behavioral Health Hospital
Vantage Point Behavioral Health Hospital 
Veterans Health Care System of the Ozarks
Washington Regional Medical Center

Public safety
The Washington County Sheriff's Office is the primary law enforcement agency in the county. The agency is led by the Washington County Sheriff, an official elected by countywide vote every four years. Ten municipalities have police departments providing law enforcement in their respective jurisdictions; Goshen, Tontitown, and Winslow contract with the Washington County Sheriff's Office for law enforcement services. All municipalities contract with the Washington County Sheriff's Office for incarceration at the Washington County Detention Center in Fayetteville. The University of Arkansas Police Department provides law enforcement on the campus of the University of Arkansas in close cooperation with the Fayetteville PD.

The county is under the jurisdiction of the Washington County District Court, a state district court. State district courts in Arkansas are courts of original jurisdiction for misdemeanors offenses and civil, small claims, and traffic matters. Local district courts are presided over by full-time judges in countywide elections.

Superseding district court jurisdiction is the 4th Judicial Circuit Court, which covers Washington and Madison counties. The 4th Circuit contains seven circuit judges, elected to six-year terms circuitwide.

Culture and contemporary life

Washington County has several facilities, monuments, and museums dedicated to preserving the history and culture of the area. The Washington County Historical Museum, owned and operated by the Washington County Historical Society, preserves and interprets the history and culture of Washington County for visitors and residents. Regional history is maintained and taught through the Shiloh Museum of Ozark History in Springdale since 1968. The Clinton House Museum in Fayetteville is a historic house museum dedicated to the lives of Bill Clinton and Hillary Rodham while they both taught at the University of Arkansas School of Law and was where they married in 1975.

Over 100 properties are listed on the National Register of Historic Places in Washington County, ranging from historic districts (UA Campus, Washington-Willow, Dickson Street, Mock Street, Springdale Poultry Industrry and others) to Civil War battlefields (Cane Hill Battlefield and Prairie Grove Battlefield Park), historic homes of area leaders (Gregg House, Stone House), community gathering places (Mineral Springs Community Building), and places of worship (Shiloh Church, United Presbyterian Church of Canehill).

Annual cultural events
Many cultural events take place in Washington County annually. Some of the largest include:
Arkansas Razorbacks football games in fall, estimated to bring 156,765 visitors from outside Northwest Arkansas in 2018
Walmart Shareholder's Meeting at Bud Walton Arena brings over 5,000 employees to Fayetteville from around the world.
Bikes, Blues, & BBQ motorcycle rally on Dickson Street in Fayetteville with over 400,000 people attending over four days
Roots Fest, annual five-day music and food festival in Fayetteville
Battle of Prairie Grove Reenactment, hundreds of Civil War reenactors camp and fight at Prairie Grove Battlefield State Park in December of even-numbered years

Government

The county government is a constitutional body granted specific powers by the Constitution of Arkansas and the Arkansas Code. The quorum court is the legislative branch of the county government and controls all spending and revenue collection. Representatives are called justices of the peace and are elected from county districts every even-numbered year. The number of districts in a county vary from nine to fifteen, and district boundaries are drawn by the county election commission. The Washington County Quorum Court has fifteen members. Presiding over quorum court meetings is the county judge, who serves as the chief operating officer of the county. The county judge is elected at-large and does not vote in quorum court business, although capable of vetoing quorum court decisions.

Taxation

Property tax is assessed by the Washington County Assessor annually based upon the fair market value of the property and determining which tax rate, commonly called a millage in Arkansas, will apply. The rate depends upon the property's location with respect to city limits, school district, and special tax increment financing (TIF) districts. This tax is collected by the Washington County Collector between the first business day of March of each year through October 15th without penalty. The Washington County Treasurer disburses tax revenues to various government agencies, such as cities, county road departments, fire departments, libraries, and police departments in accordance with the budget set by the quorum court.

Sales and use taxes in Arkansas are voter approved and collected by the Arkansas Department of Finance and Administration.
Arkansas's statewide sales and use tax has been 6.5% since July 1, 2013. Washington County has an additional sales and use tax of 1.25% since December 1, 2004. Within Washington County, Greenland and West Fork have 3.0% additional sales and use tax, Elkins, Prairie Grove, Tontitown have a rate of 2.75%,  Farmington, Fayetteville, Johnson, Lincoln, and Springdale are at 2%, and Elm Springs and Goshen have tax rates of 1%. The Arkansas State Treasurer disburses tax revenue to counties/cities in accordance with tax rules.

Politics
In Congress, Arkansas has been represented by two Republican senators (John Boozman and Tom Cotton) since January 3, 2015, ending a long history of Democratic hegemony. In the House of Representatives, Washington County is within the Arkansas 3rd district, an oddly shaped district that includes Northwest Arkansas and extends east to Russellville. The Arkansas 3rd has been represented by Republican Steve Womack since 2010.

In the Arkansas Senate, Washington County contains one Senate district, and parts of four others. The historically Democratic 4th District contains Fayetteville, and has been represented by Greg Leding (D) since 2019. The 2nd District, which includes western Benton and Washington counties, has been represented by Jim Hendren (I) since 2013. The 5th District, stretching from Missouri to Oklahoma, contains much of southern Washington County and has been represented by Bob Ballinger (R) since 2011. The 7th District, represented by Colby Fulfer (R) since winning a special election in February 2022, contains much of Springdale and eastern Washington County. A very small portion of Washington County has been represented by Bart Hester (R) of the 1st District, which includes most of Bentonville and surrounding communities.

Arkansas House Of Representatives 
Washington County is divided between 10 state house districts.

National politics 

Washington County has largely bucked the Democratic trend in counties dominated by college towns, however, this has become less true in recent years.  Only two Democrats have carried the county since 1964, Jimmy Carter in 1976 and Arkansas native (and for a time, Fayetteville resident) Bill Clinton in 1992 and 1996. However, Clinton only managed pluralities in both of his bids.

Washington County has voted Republican the past few decades. However, it is not nearly as Republican as other counties in western Arkansas. The Republican margin in the county has decreased since 2016. In 2012, voters supported Mitt Romney by giving him 56.3% of the vote compared to Barack Obama's 40.1% of the vote, a 16.2% difference. In 2016, Bill Clinton's wife, Hillary, picked up 40.8% of the vote while Donald Trump picked up 50.7% of the vote, a 9.9% difference, a sharp decrease in the Republican voters. In 2020, Joe Biden improved this by getting 46.5% of the vote while Trump got 50.4% of the vote, a 3.9% difference. Biden's 46.5% of the vote was the best for a Democrat in the county since Jimmy Carter in 1976. In 2022, Washington County narrowly supported Democrat Chris Jones over Republican Sarah Huckabee Sanders for governor, and was the only county to flip from red to blue from 2018. 

The City of Fayetteville leans democratic. Greg Leding represents the 4th District which contains Fayetteville and has historically been Democratic. Fayetteville mayor Lionel Jordan is also a Democrat as well. However, the rest of the county, 
is majority-Republican.

Communities

Cities

Elkins
Elm Springs (partly in Benton County)
Farmington
Fayetteville (county seat)
Goshen
Greenland
Johnson
Lincoln
Prairie Grove
Springdale (partly in Benton County)
Tontitown
West Fork
Winslow

Census-designated places
 Canehill
 Cincinnati
 Evansville
 Morrow
 Summers

Other unincorporated communities

 Appleby
 Arnett
 Baldwin
 Banyard
 Black Oak
 Blackburn
 Blue Springs Village
 Brentwood
 Clyde
 Durham
 Dutch Mills
 Fayette Junction
 Floss
 Gulley
 Habberton
 Harmon
 Harris
 Hazel Valley
 Hicks
 Hogeye
 Hubbard
 Mayfield
 McNair
 Mount Olive
 Oak Grove
 Odell
 Onda
 Pilgrim's Rest
 Pitkin Corner
 Rhea
 Rochelle Riviera
 Savoy
 Shady Grove
 Skylight
 Sonora
 Spring Valley
 Starks
 Steele
 Strain
 Strickler
 Sulphur City
 Sunset
 Suttle
 Tolu
 Tuttle
 Viney Grove
 Walnut Grove
 War Eagle Cove
 Weddington
 Wedington Woods
 Wheeler
 White Rock
 Woolsey
 Wyman
 Wyola

Townships

Townships in Arkansas are the divisions of a county.  Each township includes unincorporated areas and some may have incorporated towns or cities within part of their space.  Townships have limited purposes in modern times.  However, they are of value for historical purposes in terms of genealogical research.  Each town or city is within one or more townships in an Arkansas county based on census maps. The townships of Washington County are listed below. In Washington County, each incorporated town/city is at least partially located within its namesake township.

 Boston
 Brush Creek
 Cane Hill
 Center
 Cove Creek
 Crawford
 Durham
 Dutch Mills
 Elkins (Elkins)
 Elm Springs (Elm Springs)
 Farmington (Farmington)
 Fayetteville (Fayetteville)
 Goshen (Goshen)
 Greenland (Greenland)
 Harmon
 Illinois
 Johnson (Johnson)
 Lee's Creek
 Lincoln (Lincoln)
 Litteral
 Marrs Hill
 Morrow
 Prairie
 Prairie Grove (Prairie Grove)
 Reed
 Rhea's Mill
 Richland
 Springdale (most of Springdale)
 Starr Hill
 Tontitown (Tontitown)
 Valley
 Vineyard
 Wedington
 West Fork (West Fork)
 White River
 Winslow (Winslow)
 Wyman

Infrastructure

Major highways

Washington County has contained the Ozark Trail, Trail of Tears, and the Butterfield Overland Mail route. Today, Interstate 49 serves as the county's main thoroughfare, and connects the University of Arkansas with Fort Smith and Interstate 40 to the south and other NWA cities to the north. Future plans call for Interstate 49 to be extended to ultimately connect New Orleans, Louisiana with Kansas City, Missouri through Washington County.

 Interstate 49
 U.S. Route 62
 U.S. Route 71
 U.S. Route 412
 U.S. Route 71B
 Highway 16
 Highway 45
 Highway 59
 Highway 74
 Highway 112
 Highway 156
 Highway 170
 Highway 180
 Highway 220
 Highway 244
 Highway 265
 Highway 303

Utilities

The Arkansas Department of Health is responsible for the regulation and oversight of public water systems throughout the state. Washington County contains twelve community water systems, including two of the largest distribution systems in the state: the City of Fayetteville (retail population served of 94,000) and Springdale Water Utilities (SWU, 87,618) Both water systems purchase all potable water from Beaver Water District. Many of the smaller cities in Washington County purchase water from Fayetteville, SWU, Benton-Washington Regional Public Water Authority (PWA, colloquially "Two-Ton") or Washington Water Authority (WWA), including Elkins, Lincoln, Tontitown, West Fork, and Winslow.

See also

 Arkansas Highway 156 (1973–1981), former state highway in Washington County
 List of counties in Arkansas
 List of lakes in Washington County, Arkansas
 List of places named for George Washington
 National Register of Historic Places listings in Washington County, Arkansas

Notes

References

External links

Washington County Historical Society
 Washington County, Arkansas entry on the Encyclopedia of Arkansas History & Culture

 
1828 establishments in Arkansas Territory
Northwest Arkansas
Populated places established in 1828